Sunshine is the third studio album by Canadian country music artist Deric Ruttan. The album was released on January 12, 2010, on Black T Records. Its first single was "Sing That Song Again".

Track listing

Chart performance

Singles

References

2010 albums
Deric Ruttan albums